William Alfred Sergeant (born 12 April 1958) is an English guitarist, best known for being a member of Echo & the Bunnymen. Born in Walton Hospital, he grew up in the village of Melling and attended nearby Deyes Lane Secondary Modern. He is the group's only constant member.

Career
As a solo artist, Sergeant focused on minimalism and atmospherics, and usually released entirely instrumental music. Sergeant's first solo work was in 1978, when he self-produced Weird As Fish and made a total of seven copies. The album was officially released 25 years later. Early in the life of Echo & the Bunnymen, Sergeant recorded La Vie Luonge, a soundtrack piece for a short Bunnymen concert film of the same name. His first formal solo album, Themes for Grind, was released in 1982, while still active with Echo & the Bunnymen, and reached number 6 on the Indie album chart.

Sergeant continued with the Bunnymen even after Ian McCulloch left in 1988, bringing in Noel Burke to sing on Reverberation in 1990, before breaking up the band in 1993. In 1994, Sergeant and McCulloch reunited to form Electrafixion. The band toured extensively and released one album, Burned, in 1995. After a few singles and more touring, the band began to play a large number of old Echo & the Bunnymen songs at their shows. In 1996, the Bunnymen reformed.

Sergeant also returned to solo work in 1997, under the moniker Glide, producing experimental, ambient and psychedelic instrumental music based around keyboard and electronic sounds. That year, he released the live Space Age Freak Out, followed by another live album, Performance, in 2000. Glide began to tour, and would often open for Echo & the Bunnymen in the early 2000s. Glide released Curvature of the Earth in 2004.

Sergeant has guested on Primal Scream's "When the Bombs Drop" (2006) and Baltic Fleet's self-titled debut album (2008).

In 2013 Will Sergeant and Les Pattinson, ex-bass player with Echo & the Bunnymen, formed "Poltergeist" with former Black Velvets drummer Nick Kilroe. They have been playing live and released an album called Your Mind Is A Box (Let Us Fill It With Wonder) in June 2013. Sergeant told journalist Jon Cronshaw that: “We don’t want to have to stick to the verse-chorus-verse format, because that’s what we have to do in the Bunnymen. We’re trying to do something that’s a bit different, and a bit more open-ended. We can do anything with this project because we’re not governed by any preconceptions about what people expect. If we wanted, we could do a 40-minute ambient nose flute solo if we really wanted, you know? I just like that aspect that we can take it anywhere.”

In 2021 he published ’Bunnyman’, the first part of his autobiography covering his childhood and the formation of Echo and the Bunnymen up until just before they replaced the drum machine with Pete de Freitas.

Equipment
Throughout his time with the Bunnymen in the 1980s, Sergeant used a black Fender Telecaster with much reverb and delay. This gave the Bunnymen sound a clear, cutting tone. On several occasions during the '80s Sergeant would use a Fender Jaguar guitar. He used a Fender Stratocaster to a great extent on the 1987 Echo & the Bunnymen album. In the music video for "Lips Like Sugar," he can be seen playing a vintage Hagström Deluxe 90, (possibly a prop since the performance is lip-synched to the studio track).  When the Bunnymen reformed in 1997 he started using his Jaguar as his main instrument with a lot of tremolo. He also uses a Vox 12 string guitar.

Discography

With Echo and the Bunnymen
See: Echo & the Bunnymen discography

With Electrafixion
See: Electrafixion#Discography

As Glide
Space Age Freak Out (1997)
Performance (2000)
Curvature of the Earth (2004, Cooking Vinyl)
Assemblage 1 & 2 (2014, 92 Happy Customers)

With Poltergeist(featuring Les Pattinson)

’’Your Mind is a Box (Let Us Fill It With Wonder)’’(2013)

Solo

Albums
Weird as Fish (1978)
Themes for Grind (1982), 92 Happy Customers – UK Indie No. 6
Weird As Fish/Le Via Luonge (2003), Ochre
Things Inside (2012), 92 Happy Customers

Singles
"Favourite Branches" (1982), Warner Music Group
"Cosmos" (1995), Ochre
"You Have Just Been Poisoned by the Serpents"  (1998), Ochre
Themes from Grind: Remixes (2000), Ochre

References

1958 births
Living people
English rock guitarists
Echo & the Bunnymen members
Electrafixion members
Musicians from Liverpool
English male guitarists